The South Sudan national football team represents South Sudan in international football and is controlled by the South Sudan Football Association, the governing body for football in South Sudan.

History
Zoran Đorđević was appointed on 25 May 2011 to oversee the national team. For their inaugural year the team was featured in Storyville episode called Soccer Coach Zoran and his African Tigers. The national team's first international fixture was due to be against the Kenya national team on 10 July 2011 as part of the country's independence celebrations. However, in the event the opposition was provided by Tusker of the Kenyan Premier League, alongside the first international fixture of the national basketball team. The match was played at the Juba Stadium. South Sudan scored within ten minutes, but they later conceded three goals in a 3–1 defeat. South Sudan was officially admitted as a CAF member on 10 February 2012, at the 34th CAF Ordinary General Assembly hosted in Libreville, Gabon. South Sudan was admitted as a FIFA member on 25 May 2012 at the second session of the 62nd FIFA Congress hosted in Budapest, Hungary.

On 10 July 2012, South Sudan competed in its first full international match, a friendly against Uganda in Juba. The match ended in a 2–2 draw, with James Moga and Richard Justin Lado scoring for South Sudan. This match resulted in South Sudan entering the FIFA rankings at the start of August in 199th place.

The South Sudanese took part in their first ever international football tournament when they took part in the 2012 CECAFA Cup in Uganda. They were drawn in Group A alongside Ethiopia, Kenya, and hosts Uganda. The national team played their first match against Ethiopia, losing 1–0 through a Yonathan Kebede goal. In their next match, they lost 2–0 against Kenya. Their final match saw them suffer a 4–0 loss to Uganda.

South Sudan entered its first major international tournament in 2014, taking part in the 2015 Africa Cup of Nations qualification. As one of the four lowest ranked national teams in Africa, it entered in the preliminary stage and was scheduled to play against Eritrea, who withdrew, thus qualifying South Sudan for the first qualifying round. There, they played Mozambique over two legs, losing 5–0 at the Estádio do Zimpeto in Maputo, but hosting a goalless draw in the second leg which was held at the Khartoum Stadium in Sudan due to the South Sudanese Civil War.

On 5 September 2015, South Sudan achieved their first official victory, a 1–0 home win against Equatorial Guinea in 2017 Africa Cup of Nations qualification. One month later South Sudan played their first ever match in FIFA World Cup Qualification, a 1–1 draw at home to Mauritania. South Sudan would lose both return matches 4–0.

During 2019 AFCON qualifying the Bright Stars achieved their record win, defeating Djibouti 6–0 in Juba, however they lost all seven of their other matches meaning they remained among the lowest ranked teams in Africa.

In October 2019, in the 2021 AFCON preliminary round, South Sudan won an away game for the first time, beating Seychelles 1–0 in Victoria to secure a 3–1 aggregate victory. This sees the Bright Stars advance to the qualifying group stage for the third consecutive edition.

South Sudan have been invited by FIFA to taking part in 2021 FIFA Arab Cup as the only non-Arab League nation . The team eventually forfeited the qualifiers after several players tested positive on COVID-19.

Results and fixtures

2022

2023

Coaches
Caretaker managers are listed in italics.

 Stephen Constantine (2009–2011)
 Malesh Soro (2011–2012)
 Ismail Balanga (2012)
 Zoran Đorđević (2012–2013)
 Ismail Balanga (2013–2014)
 Salyi Lolaku Samuel (2014)
 Lee Sung-jea (2014–2015)
 Leo Adraa (2015–2016)
 Joseph Malesh (2016)
 Elya Wako (2017)
 Bilal Felix Komoyangi (2017–2018)
 Ahcene Aït-Abdelmalek (2018)
 Ramsey Sebit (2018)
 Cyprian Besong Ashu (2019–2021)
 Stefano Cusin (2021–present)

Players

Current squad
Players were called up for the 2023 Africa Cup of Nations qualification matches.
 Match date: 23 and 27 March 2023
 Opposition: 
 Caps and goals correct as of: 28 July 2022, after the match against .

Recent call ups

Player records

Players in bold are still active with South Sudan.

Most appearances

Top goalscorers

Competitive record

FIFA World Cup

Africa Cup of Nations

African Nations Championship

CECAFA Cup

Arab Cup record

 The 2009 edition was cancelled during qualification.

Head-to-head record

Dual-internationals
The following South Sudanese international footballers have also played for Sudan national football team before the country's independence:
James Moga – forward for Sudan. Played for them in 2002 FIFA World Cup qualification and 2006 FIFA World Cup qualification. Played 14 matches and scored six goals.
Richard Justin Lado – Experienced defender in club football for Khartoum 3 and played for Sudan between 2008 and 2012.
Athir Thomas – defender in Sudan before the country's partition.
Roy Gulwak – Goalkeeper who represented Sudan in two 2010 FIFA World Cup qualification matches in 2009, conceding two goals.
Khamis Martin – Played one international game for Sudan in 2010.

Notes & references

Notes

References

External links

Official South Sudan FA website
South Sudan at FIFA.com
South Sudan – List of International Matches 

 
National
African national association football teams
2011 establishments in South Sudan